Urdog are an experimental psychedelic and progressive rock band from Providence, Rhode Island. The band consists of David Lifrieri (guitar, vocals), Jeff Knoch (moog, vocals) and Erin Rosenthal (drums, vocals).

As of their set at Terrastock 6 in Providence (April, 2006), Urdog are on an indefinite hiatus.

Discography 
 Urdog, June 2003, self-released
 Garden of Bones, July 2004, Secret Eye
 Eyelid of Moon, April 2005, Secret Eye
 Danger on the Edge of Town, 2006, self-released

Compilations  
Neighborhood Contributor, 2003, MassDist
Invisible Pyramid: Elegy Box, September 2005, Last Visible Dog

External links  
Official Website
Secret Eye records
Foxy Digitalis interview

Rock music groups from Rhode Island
American psychedelic rock music groups
American progressive rock groups
American experimental rock groups
Musical groups from Providence, Rhode Island
American musical trios